Septoria aciculosa is a fungal plant pathogen infecting strawberries.

References

External links 
 Index Fungorum
 USDA ARS Fungal Database

aciculosa
Fungi described in 1884
Fungal strawberry diseases